PP-115 (Gujrat-VIII) was a Constituency of Provincial Assembly of Punjab.It was abolished after 2018 delimitations when Gujrat District lost 1 seat after 2017 Census.

General elections 2013
General elections were held on 11 May 2013. Chuhdary Shabir Ahmed kotla of Pakistan Muslim league N won by 42562 votes. And Runner up candidate was Naeem Raza kotla of PML-Q 24322. And PTI candidate was on 3rd with 20893 votes.

General elections 2008

}

See also

 Punjab, Pakistan

References

External links
 Election commission Pakistan's official website
 Awazoday.com check result
 Official Website of Government of Punjab

Provincial constituencies of Punjab, Pakistan